Gleaming the Cube (also known as A Brother's Justice and Skate or Die; released in the Philippines as Challenge to Win Again) is a 1989 American neo-noir film directed by Graeme Clifford and starring Christian Slater as Brian Kelly, a 16-year-old skateboarder investigating the death of his adopted Vietnamese brother.

The skating technical advisor for the film was original Z-Boy Stacy Peralta. Among the skateboarders who appear in the film as stunt skaters are Mike McGill, Mark "Gator" Rogowski, Rodney Mullen, Rich Dunlop, Eric Dressen, Lance Mountain, Mike Vallely, Chris Black, Ted Ehr, Natas Kaupas, Chris Borst, and Steve Saiz. Tony Hawk (Buddy) and Tommy Guerrero (Sam), then members of the Bones Brigade, appear in the film as members of Brian's skate crew. Christian Jacobs, future lead singer of The Aquabats and creator of Yo Gabba Gabba!, also appears in the film as Gremic.

The film received a moderate release in the United States from 20th Century Fox (in 469 theaters). Although the film had a relatively low box office turnout, it garnered a significant cult following after its theatrical release, through basic cable replays on networks such as USA and the burgeoning VHS (and later DVD) market, as well as among skateboarders.

The title of the film refers to the cryptic question "Have you ever gleemed [sic] inside a cube?" that Garry Scott Davis (GSD) asked Neil Blender in an interview in the December 1983 issue of Thrasher magazine. In the film, Christian Slater's character defines "gleaming the cube" as "pushing your limits to the edge". The DVD contains an easter egg; by highlighting the skateboard on the main menu, viewers can watch a short featurette entitled "What Does Gleaming the Cube Mean?".

Plot
Brian Kelly is an unmotivated high school student in Orange County, California. An avid skateboarder, Brian is frequently at odds with his parents for his increasingly reckless behavior, which has landed him in jail on more than one occasion. The only person in the family Brian can relate to is his adopted Vietnamese brother Vinh, who works as a shipping clerk for the Vietnamese Anti-Communist Relief Fund (VACRF), an organization which sends medical supplies to Vietnam.

When Vinh discovers a suspicious inaccuracy in VACRF's shipping records, he brings it to his boss Colonel Trac, who fires Vinh when he tries to investigate. Undeterred, Vinh sneaks into Westpac Medical Supplies, the warehouse handling VACRF's shipping, but is apprehended by owner Ed Lawndale. Vinh is interrogated by Lawndale and Bobby Nguyen, another of Colonel Trac's employees, at a motel. When Colonel Trac arrives, it is revealed that he and Lawndale are conspirators in a scheme to smuggle illegal weapons to Vietnam. Convinced that Vinh poses no threat to their operation, Trac intends to set him free, but Vinh is accidentally strangled to death by Nguyen. They hang Vinh's body from a noose, so the police deem it a suicide.

After the funeral, Brian finds the list of medical supplies Vinh was investigating, written in Vietnamese. Looking for someone to translate it, he encounters Bobby Nguyen who starts to follow him. Brian sneaks into the backseat of Nguyen’s car and witnesses a meeting with Trac and Lawndale, in which Nguyen demands $50,000 and a ticket to Bangkok at gunpoint, but a struggle ensues and Lawndale kills Nguyen. Brian flees to notify the police, but they find no trace of the crime and later learn that Nguyen supposedly arrived in Thailand. Brian tries to convince Detective Al Lucero that his brother did not commit suicide. While skeptical, Lucero offers to look into it.

Suspicious of Colonel Trac, Brian reaches out to Trac's daughter Tina, a fellow high school student and Vinh's ex-girlfriend. After an image makeover, Brian asks her out on a date and the two become closer. He attends one of VACRF's social functions, where he notices Lawndale and learns of his connection to Trac and Westpac. Following in his brother's footsteps, Brian sneaks into Lawndale's warehouse and uncovers a shipping crate full of weapons.

Brian causes an explosion at the warehouse and plants evidence to incriminate Trac, but Lucero immediately suspects Brian and admonishes him for the act. However, the incident causes Trac to panic and send his wife and daughter away to his brother's house. A distressed Tina spends the night with Brian instead and discovers a lighter belonging to her father in Brian's room, leading Brian to explain all his suspicions to her. Tina angrily confronts her father about the conspiracy, who is shamed by his involvement and contacts Lawndale to end the operation. In response, Lawndale sends a group of Vietnamese motorcyclists to run Brian down on the street. The police manage to apprehend the bikers and, with the aid of an interpreter, Lucero is able to confirm Lawndale's role in the attack.

Brian visits his friend Yabbo, who builds a newer, faster skateboard for Brian and rallies the rest of the skateboarding clique. Brian and the police both converge upon Colonel Trac's house, where Lawndale holds Tina at gunpoint. When Trac tries to wrestle the gun away, Brian crashes into the room through the window, but Lawndale shoots and kills Trac then escapes in a police car. Brian, Lucero, and the entire skateboarding crew eventually corner Lawndale. As Lawndale prepares to shoot Brian, he soars into the air on his skateboard and knocks Lawndale out; he is subsequently arrested by Lucero.

Brian comforts Tina about her father's death and suggests that they return to school together, implying that their relationship will continue. Afterwards, Brian and Lucero visit Vinh's grave before driving away.

Cast
 Christian Slater as Brian Kelly 
 Steven Bauer as Al Lucero
 Richard Herd as Ed Lawndale
 Le Tuan as Colonel Trac 
 Min Luong as Tina Trac
 Art Chudabala as Vinh Kelly
 Ed Lauter as Mr. Kelly
 Micole Mercurio as Mrs. Kelly 
 Peter Kwong as Bobby Nguyen 
 Max Perlich as "Yabbo"
 Tony Hawk as Buddy
 Christian Jacobs as Gremic
 Renowned stuntman Buddy Joe Hooker makes a cameo at the start of the chase scene's freeway segment as the driver whose Corvette gets sideswiped

Locations
According to Peralta, locations for the movie were scouted from the sky:

I got to survey Orange County in a helicopter scouting for pools that we might be able to use. Hills. Different street situations that might work for skating locations. And then we'd land and approach the people for permission.

Sites selected for filming included:
 The Anaheim motel in the movie, the "Atomic Age Lodge", was in reality the Stovall's Cosmic Age Lodge on Katella Avenue, across the street from the then-Disneyland parking lot. It was one of a group of Stovall's hotels in the area with a "Space Age" theme (the others being Stovall's Apollo Inn and Stovall's Space Age Lodge and the Inn Of Tomorrow). The Cosmic Age was demolished in the late 1990s to make room for Disney California Adventure. The others have been remodeled and no longer have the space theme.
 Most of the school scenes were filmed at Woodbridge High in Irvine, California.
The video store, pool hall, and Brian trying to find a translator scenes were filmed along Bolsa Avenue between Magnolia St. and Ward St. in Westminster, California.
 The Pizza Hut where Tony Hawk's character works is now a Taco Bell, still standing at 2941 West Imperial Highway in the city of Inglewood.
 Some introductory scenes were filmed at John Wayne Airport (Orange County, California) before major renovation work on the terminal.
 The hill scene was filmed on 17th Street between Patton and Leland in San Pedro, California.
 The car chase scene near the end of the movie was filmed on West Seaside Way between the 500 to 700 block in Long Beach, California.
 Brian's ferry ride was from Balboa Island to the Balboa Peninsula where on his bike he met his skateboarding friends at the Balboa Fun Zone in Newport Beach.

Release
Gleaming the Cube was released in the United States on January 13, 1989. In the Philippines, the film was released as Challenge to Win Again in mid-1990.

Critical response
The film gained mostly negative reviews from critics; only 29% of critics cited on the site Rotten Tomatoes offer a positive review.

Legacy
Professional skateboarder Stevie Williams has stated in an online interview that Slater's character in the film was his first skateboarding influence.

Skateboarding figure Tony Hawk, in a 2008 interview with Slater, revealed that he is continually asked if Slater actually skated in the film. Hawk has remained in contact with Slater well beyond the production of the film.

References

External links

 Origin of Gleaming the Cube film title in the December 1983 issue of Thrasher

1989 films
1989 action films
1980s teen films
20th Century Fox films
American independent films
American teen films
Films directed by Graeme Clifford
Films set in Orange County, California
Films with screenplays by Michael Tolkin
Punk films
Skateboarding films
1980s English-language films
1980s American films